South Pelion (Notio Pilio) is a municipality in the Magnesia regional unit, Thessaly, Greece. The seat of the municipality is the town Argalasti. The municipality has an area of 368.539 km2. It comprises the southern part of Mount Pelion.

Municipality
The municipality South Pelion was formed at the 2011 local government reform by the merger of the following 5 former municipalities, that became municipal units:
Afetes
Argalasti
Milies
Sipiada
Trikeri

References

Municipalities of Thessaly
Pelion